Yachad, the national Jewish council for people with disabilities, is a national organization that addresses the needs of Jews who have disabilities, and makes possible their integration into Jewish life.

Policy 
Yachad has an inclusive policy that aims to give persons with disabilities the chance to have their place in the Jewish community. It helps to educate and advocate for understanding, acceptance, and outreach, and looks to foster a positive attitude towards people with differing abilities.

Services 
Yachad offers several clinical services for persons with disabilities. The organization gives customized guidance and support for families, siblings and parents.

The program "Our Way" includes persons who are hard of hearing and deaf-blind individuals. Shabbatons are inclusive weekend retreats, where Yachad members can be together with a group of mates. The "IVDU" schools offer students with special needs an understanding and nurturing educational background.

References

External links 
Website

Jewish charities based in the United States